The 2017 FIL Junior European Luge Championships took place under the auspices of the International Luge Federation at Oberhof, Germany from 21 to 22 January 2017.

Schedule
Four events will be held.

Medalists

Medal table

References

FIL Junior European Luge Championships
FIL Junior European Luge Championships
FIL Junior European Luge Championships
International luge competitions hosted by Germany